ASPT can refer to:

 Army School of Physical Training
 American Society of Plant Taxonomists
 American Society of Phlebotomy Technicians
 Advanced sleep-phase type of circadian rhythm sleep disorder; see Advanced sleep phase disorder